Winfree Academy is a set of charter high schools located in North Texas.

Locations
Dallas Campus - 2550 Beckleymeade Ave #150,170, Dallas, TX 75237
Grand Prairie Campus - 2985 S State Highway 360 #160, Grand Prairie, TX 75052
Irving Campus - 3110 Skyway Cir S, Irving, TX 75038
Lewisville Campus - 341 Bennett Ln, Lewisville, TX 75057
North Richland Hills Campus - 6311 Boulevard 26, North Richland Hills, TX 76118
Richardson Campus - 1661 Gateway Blvd, Richardson, TX 75080

Sources

External links

Educational institutions established in 1997
Public education in Texas
1997 establishments in Texas